Scouting on Niue comes under the administration of Scouting New Zealand, continuing the arrangement from before the Niue became a self-governing dependency of New Zealand.

See also

External links

Niue
Niue
Niuean